Mikuni Station (三国駅) is the name of two train stations in Japan:

 Mikuni Station (Fukui)
 Mikuni Station (Osaka)